Canadian National Depot or Warroad Depot is a former railway station for the Canadian National Railway.  The building now serves as an office for the City of Warroad in the U.S. state of Minnesota.

External links
National Register of Historic Places
Warroad Area Chamber of Commerce

References

Buildings and structures in Roseau County, Minnesota
Canadian National Railway stations
Railway stations in the United States opened in 1914
Railway stations on the National Register of Historic Places in Minnesota
Former railway stations in Minnesota
National Register of Historic Places in Roseau County, Minnesota